Minnie Hollow Wood (1930s) was a Lakota woman who earned the right to wear a war bonnet because of her valor in combat against the U.S. Cavalry at the Battle of Little Big Horn. At one time, she was the only woman in her tribe entitled to wear a war bonnet.

Biography 
Her husband, Hollow Wood, was a Cheyenne who also fought at the Little Big Horn. Both Hollow Woods surrendered to Colonel Nelson A. Miles at Fort Keogh in Montana in 1877.

Minnie Hollow Wood lived on the Cheyenne reservation in Montana and became an informant of author and ethnologist Thomas Bailey Marquis.  Marquis suggested that she was a "favorite" of Miles while she was a prisoner at Fort Keogh.

Representation in popular culture 
Minnie Hollow Wood was the subject of an animated short by Yvonne Russo. Minnie's War Bonnet premiered at the Red Nation International Film Festival in 2019.

See also
Buffalo Calf Road Woman
Moving Robe Woman
One Who Walks With the Stars
Pretty Nose

References

External links
Minnie's War Bonnet – animated short
Directory of Plains Indians at the Battle of the Little Big Horn
Two images of Minnie Hollow Wood in "Native American Women and the U.S. Military"

1850s births
1930s deaths
Native American women in warfare
Lakota people
People of the Great Sioux War of 1876
Women in 19th-century warfare
19th-century Native American women
20th-century Native American women
20th-century Native Americans